Lane College is a private historically black college associated with the Christian Methodist Episcopal Church and located in Jackson, Tennessee. It offers associate and baccalaureate degrees in the arts and sciences.

History 
Lane College was founded in 1882 by the Colored Methodist Episcopal (C.M.E.) Church in America as the C.M.E. High School. It was named after Methodist Bishop Isaac Lane who co-founded the school. Planning for the school had begun in 1878, but the school's establishment was delayed by a yellow fever epidemic in the region in 1878. Its primary purpose was the education of newly freed slaves, and the original curriculum focused on the preparation of "teachers and preachers."

Academics 
Lane College is accredited by the Commission on Colleges of the Southern Association of Colleges and Schools to award associate's and bachelor's degrees.

Athletics
The Lane College Department of Athletics sponsors men's intercollegiate baseball, basketball, football, cross country, and tennis along with women's intercollegiate softball, basketball, cross country, volleyball, and tennis. The school's athletic teams are nicknamed the Dragons and compete in Division II of the NCAA. The athletic teams compete as a part of the Southern Intercollegiate Athletic Conference.

Former Lane football player Jacoby Jones became the first player in history to score a receiving touchdown and a return touchdown in a Super Bowl, as a member of the Baltimore Ravens.

Notable alumni

Namesake
, a World War II Victory Ship, one of the few surviving, was named for Lane College. It is now docked in San Pedro, California (which is part of the commercial harbor area of Los Angeles to the south of downtown). It is now open as a museum.

References

External links

 Official website

 
Historically black universities and colleges in the United States
Jackson, Tennessee
Private universities and colleges in Tennessee
Schools in Madison County, Tennessee
Universities and colleges affiliated with the Christian Methodist Episcopal Church
Educational institutions established in 1882
1882 establishments in Tennessee
Historic districts on the National Register of Historic Places in Tennessee
National Register of Historic Places in Madison County, Tennessee
Universities and colleges accredited by the Southern Association of Colleges and Schools
Education in Madison County, Tennessee
Buildings and structures in Madison County, Tennessee
1900s architecture in the United States
Neoclassical architecture in Tennessee